Weijie is a given name. Notable people with the name include:

Gong Weijie (born 1986), Chinese badminton player
Jiang Weijie (born 1991), Chinese professional Go player
Sui Weijie (born 1983), Chinese footballer